The following is a list of events affecting American television during 2001. Events listed include television series debuts, finales, cancellations, and channel initiations, closures and re-brandings, as well as information about controversies and disputes.

Events

January

February

March

April

May

June

July

August

September

October

November

December

Programs

Debuts

Returning this year

Ending this year

Entering syndication this year

Changes of network affiliation

Notable TV movies

Television stations

Station launches

Network affiliation changes

Births

Deaths

See also 
 2001 in the United States
 List of American films of 2001

References

External links
List of 2001 American television series at IMDb

 
2000s in American television